James Andrew Sirtosky (January 23, 1914 – August 11, 2015), known as Jim Freeman, was an American football player and coach. He served as the head football coach at Ball State Teachers College—now Ball State University—from 1956 to 1961, compiling a record of 18–28–2. Born January 23, 1914, he  turned 100 in 2014 and died on August 11, 2015, aged 101.

Head coaching record

References

1914 births
2015 deaths
American centenarians
Men centenarians
American football guards
Ball State Cardinals football coaches
UConn Huskies football coaches
Indiana Hoosiers football coaches
Indiana Hoosiers football players
People from Washington County, Pennsylvania